Clément Chausson (25 November 1887 — 12 January 1961) was a French politician.

He was a member of the French Communist Party, and served as mayor of Tulle from 1947 to 1949. He was also a member of the French National Assembly. He was a member of the regional office in December 1938. He later became president of the wood merchants' union in the Corrèze.

Biography
Clément Chausson was born in Saint-Hilaire-Foissac, France on 1887 and died in Saint-Bonnet-Avalouze, France on 1961 at the age of 73. He held this position until 1949 and retained his mandate as municipal councilor in the 1953 elections. He acquired near Tulle an agricultural property which he exploited with his family at the liberation. He spent the last years of his life taking care of his exploitation around Tulle.

See also
 List of mayors of Tulle

References 

1887 births
1961 deaths
People from Corrèze
French Communist Party politicians
Members of the Constituent Assembly of France (1945)
Members of the Constituent Assembly of France (1946)
Deputies of the 1st National Assembly of the French Fourth Republic
Deputies of the 2nd National Assembly of the French Fourth Republic
Mayors of places in Nouvelle-Aquitaine